NGC 7772 is collection of stars in the constellation Pegasus that were thought to be an open cluster. The stars were first recorded on 7 October 1825 by the British astronomer John Herschel. Gaia data shows stars in the area are unrelated.

See also
 List of NGC objects

References

External links
 

Open clusters
7772
Pegasus (constellation)